Fort Rock–Christmas Lake Valley  is a basin of a former inland sea that existed in that region from Pliocene through late Pleistocene time.

During the Pleistocene and early Holocene, Paleolake Fort Rock encompassed the entire basin.

Paleolake Fort Rock

The Fort Rock basin is an endorheic basin. Increased moisture in this semiarid environment during the Pleistocene through increased cloud cover and cooler temperatures resulted in higher lake levels. At its maximum, the lake filled the basin up to 75 m deep (245 ft), with a surface area of over 2,300 km2  (900 mi2). While this is larger than any modern lakes in Oregon, Paleolake Fort Rock was smaller than any of the other paleolakes to the south.

There are four major shorelines of Fort Rock basin from the paleolake. These shorelines are identified through recording wave-cut and depositional terraces, lagoons, and convex sedimentary deposits such as bars, spits, and beach ridges. The floor of the Fort Rock basin is relatively flat at around 1,315 m (4,315 ft) throughout much of the basin, so the depths of the lake at each level were fairly consistent.

The highest shoreline at 1,384 m (4,540 ft) is best seen at Fandango Canyon, but traces of beach sediments and wave-washed scarps have also been identified at Cougar Mountain and the southern end of the Connley Hills. The lake had an average depth of 70 meters (230 feet), with a maximum depth of 76 meters (250 feet) at the eastern edge of the basin. The Connley Hills and Buchgrass Butte formed two major islands.

The next shoreline at 1,364–67 m (4,475–85 ft) is seen at only a few places in the Fort Rock basin, such as Fandango Canyon and Cougar Mountain. This level formed the caves at the top of the southern toe of the Connley Hills. The lake was 52 meters (170 feet) deep at this level and covered an area of 1,945 km2 (1208 mi2). The only islands exposed were the Connely Hills, Buchgrass Butte, and the Fort Rock tuff ring.

The 1,353–1356 m (4,440–4450 ft) shoreline is the most strongly developed, as it carved the notches in Fort Rock and the caves in the Connley Hills and Cougar Mountain. The lake was, on average, 38 meters (125 feet) deep and covered 1736 km2 (1078 mi2).

The lowest shoreline at 1,332 m (4,370 ft) is seen as wave-washed cliffs at Flatiron Ridge and beach ridges and bars all over the basin. The lake was relatively shallow at about 17 meters (55 feet) deep and 1323 km2 (511 mi2). This level was almost 1000 km2 smaller than the lake at its high stand.

Archaeology

Fort Rock Cave 

Prior to the excavation of the Paisley Caves, Fort Rock Cave was the earliest evidence of human occupation in the Oregon. The cave was initially excavated by Luther Cressman in 1938 and during this summer his team discovered numerous well preserved sagebrush-bark sandals. This collection has been named the oldest-dated footwear, as the oldest sandal dates to around 10,000 years old. The cave is located approximately 1.5 miles (2.4 km) west of Fort Rock near Fort Rock State Natural Area in Lake County. Fort Rock Cave was declared a National Historic Landmark in 1961, and added to the National Register of Historic Places in 1966.

Connley Caves 

The Connley Caves are six wave-cut notches in the Connley Hills that have been intermittently occupied from at least 11,200 BP to 3,140 BP. Volcanic ash from the Mazama eruption created a notable layer dating to 6,850 BP that was found in all the caves. The pre-Mazama archaeological deposits were rich in the bones of marshland animals, including birds such as ducks, sage-grouse, and grebes, small mammals like rabbits, gophers, and ground squirrels, and large animals such as pronghorn antelope, elk, and bison. These animals provide evidence for the previous wetland environment at the Connley Caves. Pine charcoal below the Mazama layer is an additional environmental indicator, as the tree only grows at cooler, wetter elevations. Artifacts from 11,000 BP to 7,000 BP show that the site was a popular camping spot. The assemblage consists of obsidian and fine-grain-basalt projectile points, knives, scrapers, drills, milling stones, cordage, and a variety of other items. Research is ongoing at the Connley Caves with the University of Oregon Archaeological Field School.

Carlon and Boulder Village 

Carlon and Boulder Village are two boulder house sites in the Fort Rock basin. Carlon Village consists of a number of stone house rings that are visible on the surface. Three test pits near the houses encountered three floors, which contained fish, rodent, rabbit, and large mammal bone were dated to 2040, 1890, and 1780 BP.

Boulder Village is the largest of the stone house sites, with 122 stone rings visible on the surface. Excavations in 17 of the houses recovered 14 radiocarbon dates, ranging from 1510 to 100 BP. The artifact assemblage included projectile points, bifaces, unifaces, obsidian flakes, and ground stone tools. Seeds were recovered from flotation and include specimens of salt sage, chenopods, and juniper.

Moffitt Butte 

Moffitt Butte is not associated with a lake basin, as is the case for Fort Rock and Hole-in-the-Ground, but rising magma probably encountered permeable aquifers beneath the cone. A line of tuff rings between Moffitt Butte and the Fort Rock–Christmas Lake Valley basin are located roughly along what would have been an early drainage route between the Fort Rock basin and the La Pine basin. A smaller vent and small tuff ring,  in diameter, are located on Moffitt Butte's southwestern flank. The crater of the smaller vent is filled with lava that issued from a dike on its northwest edge.

Table Rock 

The cone is capped with flat-lying basalt which once filled the crater, but erosion has modified the original cone, exposing the once ponded basalt lava lake. Dikes extend north and south of the crater's lava lake. On the lower flanks of the cone, the rocks are mostly palagonite lapilli-tuff. Near the summit, the uppermost palagonites are overlain by massive cinders and bombs from fire-fountaining that preceded the filling of the crater with lava.

Notable vents

See also 
 Fort Rock
 List of volcanoes in the United States of America

References 

 Portions of this article include public domain text from the USFS Deschutes & Ochoco National Forests - Crooked River National Grassland.

Volcanic fields of the Great Basin section
Volcanoes of Oregon
Maars of Oregon
Landforms of Lake County, Oregon